The 2017 Dubai Tour was a road cycling stage race that took place in Dubai between 31 January and 4 February 2017. It was the fourth edition of the Dubai Tour and was rated as a 2.HC event as part of the 2017 UCI Asia Tour.

The race was won for the second consecutive year by Germany's Marcel Kittel for the  team. Kittel won three of the four stages to be run – comfortably winning the points classification as a result – while in the other stage, Kittel was involved in a skirmish with Andriy Hrivko, which resulted in the  rider being ejected from the race. Kittel won the overall classification by 18 seconds ahead of 's Dylan Groenewegen from the Netherlands, who won the young rider classification in doing so. The final podium was completed by Kittel's compatriot John Degenkolb, a further two seconds in arrears, with the  rider winning the stage not won by Kittel. In the other race classifications, Italian rider Nicola Boem won the intermediate sprints classification, while the  squad won the teams classification.

Teams
As the Dubai Tour was a 2.HC event, a limited number of UCI WorldTeams were able to participate in the race. In total, 16 teams participated in the race: 10 UCI WorldTeams, 4 Professional Continental teams, Continental team , and a national selection from the United Arab Emirates.

Route
For the 2017 Dubai Tour, the race was extended from four stages to five stages. The full itinerary was released on 13 December 2016.

The stage was later cancelled altogether due to the winds.

Stages

Stage 1
31 January 2017 — Dubai to Palm Jumeirah,

Stage 2
1 February 2017 — Dubai to Ras al-Khaimah,

Stage 3
2 February 2017 — Dubai to Al Aqah,

Stage 4
3 February 2017 — Hatta to Hatta Dam, 

The stage was cancelled altogether due to strong winds.

Stage 5
4 February 2017 — Dubai to City Walk,

Classification leadership table
In the 2017 Dubai Tour, four different jerseys were awarded. For the general classification, calculated by adding each cyclist's finishing times on each stage, and allowing time bonuses for the first three finishers at intermediate sprints and at the finish of mass-start stages, the leader received a blue jersey. This classification was considered the most important of the 2017 Dubai Tour, and the winner of the classification was considered the winner of the race.

Additionally, there was a points classification, which awarded a red jersey. In the points classification, cyclists received points for finishing in the top 10 in a stage. For winning a stage, a rider earned 25 points, with 16 for second, 11 for third, 8 for fourth, 6 for fifth with a point fewer per place down to a single point for 10th place. Points towards the classification could also be accrued at intermediate sprint points during each stage; these intermediate sprints also offered bonus seconds towards the general classification. There was also a sprints classification for the points awarded at the aforementioned intermediate sprints, where the leadership of which was marked by a jersey in the colours of the United Arab Emirates flag.

The fourth jersey represented the young rider classification, marked by a white jersey. This was decided in the same way as the general classification, but only riders born after 1 January 1992 were eligible to be ranked in the classification. There was also a classification for teams, in which the times of the best three cyclists per team on each stage were added together; the leading team at the end of the race was the team with the lowest total time.

Notes

References

External links
 

2017
2017 in Emirati sport
2017 UCI Asia Tour
January 2017 sports events in Asia
February 2017 sports events in Asia